cfdisk is a Linux  partition editor, similar to fdisk, but with a different, curses-based user interface. It is part of the util-linux package of Linux utility programs.

The current cfdisk implementation utilizes the libfdisk library and supports partitioning of disks, that use Master boot record, GUID Partition Table, BSD disklabel, SGI or SUN disk labels.
It also provides information about mount points and general partition information like partition names, types/flags, sizing and UUIDs.

If invoked without arguments, cfdisk attempts to read the current partition table from the disk drive and present its findings.

See also
 format
 gpart
 parted, GParted
 diskpart
 List of disk partitioning software

References

External links
Manual
How-To
Debian Package
GNU fdisk/cfdisk
cfdisk(8) - Linux man page

 Disk partitioning software
 Free partitioning software
 Linux file system-related software
 Software that uses ncurses
 Software that uses S-Lang